Urinary retention is an inability to completely empty the bladder. Onset can be sudden or gradual. When of sudden onset, symptoms include an inability to urinate and lower abdominal pain. When of gradual onset, symptoms may include loss of bladder control, mild lower abdominal pain, and a weak urine stream. Those with long-term problems are at risk of urinary tract infections.

Causes include blockage of the urethra, nerve problems, certain medications, and weak bladder muscles. Blockage can be caused by benign prostatic hyperplasia (BPH), urethral strictures, bladder stones, a cystocele, constipation, or tumors. Nerve problems can occur from diabetes, trauma, spinal cord problems, stroke, or heavy metal poisoning. Medications that can cause problems include anticholinergics, antihistamines, tricyclic antidepressants, cyclobenzaprine, diazepam, nonsteroidal anti-inflammatory drugs (NSAID), amphetamines, and opioids. Diagnosis is typically based on measuring the amount of urine in the bladder after urinating.

Treatment is typically with a catheter either through the urethra or lower abdomen. Other treatments may include medication to decrease the size of the prostate, urethral dilation, a urethral stent, or surgery. Males are more often affected than females. In males over the age of 40 about 6 per 1,000 are affected a year. Among males over 80 this increases 30%.

Signs and symptoms 
Onset can be sudden or gradual. When the onset is sudden, symptoms include an inability to urinate and lower abdominal pain. When of gradual onset, symptoms may include loss of bladder control, mild lower abdominal pain, and a weak urine stream. Those with long-term problems are at risk of urinary tract infections.

Causes

Bladder
 Infection
 Detrusor sphincter dyssynergia
 Neurogenic bladder (commonly spinal cord damage, pelvic splanchic nerve damage, cauda equina syndrome,  pontine micturition or storage center lesions, demyelinating diseases or Parkinson's disease)
 Iatrogenic (caused by medical treatment/procedure) scarring of the bladder neck (commonly from removal of indwelling catheters or cystoscopy operations)
 Damage to the bladder

Prostate
 Benign prostatic hyperplasia (BPH)
 Prostate cancer and other pelvic malignancies
 Prostatitis

Penile urethra
 Congenital urethral valves
 Phimosis or pinhole meatus
 Circumcision
 Obstruction in the urethra, for example a stricture (usually caused either by injury or STD), a metastasis or a precipitated pseudogout crystal in the urine
 Pseudodyssynergia
 STD lesions (gonorrhoea causes numerous strictures, leading to a "rosary bead" appearance, whereas chlamydia usually causes a single stricture)
 Emasculation

Postoperative
Risk factors include
 Age: Older people may have degeneration of neural pathways involved with bladder function and it can lead to an increased risk of postoperative urinary retention. The risk of postoperative urinary retention increases up to 2.11 fold for people older than 60 years.
 Medications: Anticholinergics and medications with anticholinergic properties, alpha-adrenergic agonists, opiates, nonsteroidal anti-inflammatories (NSAIDs), calcium-channel blockers and beta-adrenergic agonists, may increase the risk.
 Anesthesia: General anesthetics during surgery may cause bladder atony by acting as a smooth muscle relaxant. General anesthetics can directly interfere with autonomic regulation of detrusor tone and predispose people to bladder overdistention and subsequent retention. Spinal anesthesia results in a blockade of the micturition reflex. Spinal anesthesia shows a higher risk of postoperative urinary retention compared to general anesthesia.
 Benign prostatic hyperplasia: Men with benign prostatic hyperplasia are at an increased risk of acute urinary retention.
 Surgery related: Operative times longer than 2 hours may lead to an increased risk of postoperative urinary retention 3-fold.
 Postoperative pain.

Chronic
Chronic urinary retention that is due to bladder blockage which can either be as a result of muscle damage or neurological damage. If the retention is due to neurological damage, there is a disconnect between the brain to muscle communication, which can make it impossible to completely empty the bladder. If the retention is due to muscle damage, it is likely that the muscles are not able to contract enough to completely empty the bladder.

The most common cause of chronic urinary retention is BPH.

Other
 Tethered spinal cord syndrome.
 Psychogenic causes – psychosocial stresses, fear associated with urination, paruresis ("shy bladder syndrome") – in extreme cases, urinary retention can result.
 Consumption of some psychoactive substances, mainly stimulants, such as MDMA or amphetamine.
 Use of NSAIDs, or drugs with anticholinergic properties.
 Stones or metastases, which can theoretically appear anywhere along the urinary tract, but vary in frequency depending on anatomy.
 Muscarinic antagonists such as atropine and scopolamine.
 Malfunctioning artificial urinary sphincter.

Diagnosis 

Analysis of urine flow may aid in establishing the type of micturition (urination) abnormality. Common findings, determined by ultrasound of the bladder, include a slow rate of flow, intermittent flow, and a large amount of urine retained in the bladder after urination. A normal test result should be 20-25 mL/s peak flow rate. A post-void residual urine greater than 50 ml is a significant amount of urine and increases the potential for recurring urinary tract infections. In adults older than 60 years, 50-100 ml of residual urine may remain after each voiding because of the decreased contractility of the detrusor muscle. In chronic retention, ultrasound of the bladder may show massive increase in bladder capacity (normal capacity is 400-600 ml).

Non-neurogenic chronic urinary retention does not have a standardized definition; however, urine volumes >300mL can be used as an informal indicator. Diagnosis of urinary retention is conducted over a period of 6 months, with 2 separate measurements of urine volume 6 months apart. Measurements should have a PVR (post-void residual) volume of >300mL.

Determining the serum prostate-specific antigen (PSA) may help diagnose or rule out prostate cancer, though this is also raised in BPH and prostatitis. A TRUS biopsy of the prostate (trans-rectal ultra-sound guided) can distinguish between these prostate conditions. Serum urea and creatinine determinations may be necessary to rule out backflow kidney damage. Cystoscopy may be needed to explore the urinary passage and rule out blockages.

In acute cases of urinary retention where associated symptoms in the lumbar spine are present such as pain, numbness (saddle anesthesia), parasthesias, decreased anal sphincter tone, or altered deep tendon reflexes, an MRI of the lumbar spine should be considered to further assess cauda equina syndrome.

Complications 

Acute urinary retention is a medical emergency and requires prompt treatment. The pain can be excruciating when urine is not able to flow out. Moreover, one can develop severe sweating, chest pain, anxiety and high blood pressure. Other patients may develop a shock-like condition and may require admission to a hospital. Serious complications of untreated urinary retention include bladder damage and chronic kidney failure. Urinary retention is a disorder treated in a hospital, and the quicker one seeks treatment, the fewer the complications.

In the longer term, obstruction of the urinary tract may cause:
 Bladder stones
 Atrophy of the detrusor muscle (atonic bladder is an extreme form)
 Hydronephrosis (congestion of the kidneys)
 Hypertrophy of the detrusor muscle (the muscle that squeezes the bladder to empty it during urination)
 Diverticula (formation of pouches) in the bladder wall (which can lead to stones and infection)

Treatment 
In acute urinary retention, urinary catheterization, placement of a prostatic stent, or suprapubic cystostomy relieves the retention. In the longer term, treatment depends on the cause. BPH may respond to alpha blocker and 5-alpha-reductase inhibitor therapy, or surgically with prostatectomy or transurethral resection of the prostate (TURP).

Use of alpha-blockers can provide relief of urinary retention following de-catheterization for both men and women. In case, if catheter can't be negotiated, suprapubic puncture can be done with lumbar puncture needle.

Medication
Some people with BPH are treated with medications. These include tamsulosin to relax smooth muscles in the bladder neck, and finasteride and dutasteride to decrease prostate enlargement. The drugs only work for mild cases of BPH but also have mild side effects. Some of the medications decrease libido and may cause dizziness, fatigue and lightheadedness.

Catheter 
Acute urinary retention is treated by placement of a urinary catheter (small thin flexible tube) into the bladder. This can be either an intermittent catheter or a Foley catheter that is placed with a small inflatable bulb that holds the catheter in place.

Intermittent catheterization can be done by a health care professional or by the person themselves (clean intermittent self catheterization).  Intermittent catheterization performed at the hospital is a sterile technique. Patients can be taught to use a self catheterization technique in one simple demonstration, and that reduces the rate of infection from long-term Foley catheters. Self catheterization requires doing the procedure periodically during the day, the frequency depending on fluid intake and bladder capacity. If fluid intake/outflow is around 1.5 litres per day, this would typically be performed roughly three times per day, i.e. roughly every six to eight hours during the day, more frequently when fluid intake is higher and/or bladder capacity lower.

For acute urinary retention, treatment requires urgent placement of a urinary catheter. A permanent urinary catheter may cause discomfort and pain that can last several days.

Older people with ongoing problems may require continued intermittent self catheterization (CISC). CISC has a lower infection risk compared to catheterization techniques that stay within the body. Challenges with CISC include compliance issues as some people may not be able to place the catheter themselves.

Surgery
The chronic form of urinary retention may require some type of surgical procedure. While both procedures are relatively safe, complications can occur.

In most patients with benign prostate hyperplasia (BPH), a procedure known as transurethral resection of the prostate (TURP) may be performed to relieve bladder obstruction. Surgical complications from TURP include a bladder infection, bleeding from the prostate, scar formation, inability to hold urine, and inability to have an erection. The majority of these complications are short lived, and most individuals recover fully within 6–12 months.

Sitting voiding position
A meta-analysis on the influence of voiding position on urodynamics in males with lower urinary tract symptoms showed that in the sitting position, the residual urine in the bladder was significantly reduced, the maximum urinary flow was increased, and the voiding time was decreased. For healthy males, no influence was found on these parameters, meaning that they can urinate in either position.

Epidemiology 
Urinary retention is a common disorder in elderly males. The most common cause of urinary retention is BPH. This disorder starts around age 50 and symptoms may appear after 10–15 years. BPH is a progressive disorder and narrows the neck of the bladder leading to urinary retention. By the age of 70, almost 10 percent of males have some degree of BPH and 33% have it by the eighth decade of life. While BPH rarely causes sudden urinary retention, the condition can become acute in the presence of certain medications including antihypertensives, antihistamines, and antiparkinson medications, and after spinal anaesthesia or stroke.

In young males, the most common cause of urinary retention is infection of the prostate (acute prostatitis). The infection is acquired during sexual intercourse and presents with low back pain, penile discharge, low grade fever and an inability to pass urine. The exact number of individuals with acute prostatitis is unknown, because many do not seek treatment. In the US, at least 1–3 percent of males under the age of 40 develop urinary difficulty as a result of acute prostatitis. Most physicians and other health care professionals are aware of these disorders. Worldwide, both BPH and acute prostatitis have been found in males of all races and ethnic backgrounds. Cancers of the urinary tract can cause urinary obstruction but the process is more gradual. Cancer of the bladder, prostate or ureters can gradually obstruct urine output. Cancers often present with blood in the urine, weight loss, lower back pain or gradual distension in the flanks.

Urinary retention in females is uncommon, occurring 1 in 100,000 every year, with a female-to-male incidence rate of 1:13. It is usually transient. The causes of UR in women can be multi-factorial, and can be postoperative and postpartum. Prompt urethral catheterization usually resolves the problem.

References

External links 

Symptoms and signs: Urinary system
Articles containing video clips
Acute pain
Wikipedia medicine articles ready to translate